The Caldwell Cubs were a Minor League Baseball team that played in the Pioneer League. The Caldwell Cubs were located in the western United States, in the town of Caldwell, Idaho, west of Boise.

History

A rookie league affiliate of the Chicago Cubs, the team played in the Pioneer League from 1964 through 1971, and their home field was Simplot Stadium in Caldwell.  During their first three seasons, they were known as the Treasure Valley Cubs as nearby Boise had lost its minor league team after the 1963 season.

The Treasure Valley Cubs were champions of the Pioneer League in their first two seasons, and were runners-up in 1966. Lack of attendance was cited as the reason for the club's demise in January 1972; they drew only 11,000 at home during the 1971 season, an average of 315 per game.

Ballpark
The Caldwell Cubs played at Simplot Stadium, at 2415 Blaine Street in Caldwell. Part of the Canyon County Fairgrounds, the venue is still in use today by the teams of the College of Idaho.

Notable alumni

 Joe Decker (1965)

 Oscar Gamble (1968) 
 Ken Holtzman (1965) 2x MLB All-Star

 Pete LaCock (1970)

 Dennis Lamp (1971)

 Joe Niekro (1966) MLB All-Star

 Billy North  (1969) 2x AL Stolen Base Leader

 Frank Reberger (1966) Caldwell Native

 Ken Rudolph (1965)

 Bill Stoneman (1966) MLB All-Star

References

External links
Baseball Reference – Caldwell teams

Defunct Pioneer League (baseball) teams
Professional baseball teams in Idaho
Caldwell, Idaho
Baseball teams established in 1964
1964 establishments in Idaho
1971 disestablishments in Idaho
Baseball teams disestablished in 1971
Defunct baseball teams in Idaho
Chicago Cubs minor league affiliates